Saifullah Bangash (born 21 March 1995) is a Pakistani cricketer who plays for Sindh. He has played for Pakistan national under-19 cricket team. He played for Karachi Kings in 2016 Pakistan Super League. He made his Twenty20 debut for Karachi Whites against Sialkot Region on 8 September 2015.

He played For Karachi University, Sui Southern Gas Corporation. He also played for Faisalabad Falcons in the US Open Cricket 2020.

Career 
In the first edition of the Pakistani Super League (PSL) in 2016, Bangash was signed by Karachi Kings as a player in the emerging category. He was signed for a reported $10,000. He was retained for the 2017 and the 2018 season.

References

External links 

 

1995 births
Living people
Pakistani cricketers
Karachi cricketers
Cricketers from Karachi
Karachi Kings cricketers
Wicket-keepers